The Football Association of Terengganu (Bahasa Melayu: Persatuan Bola Sepak Negeri Terengganu (PBSNT) enters a team in Malaysian football competitions to represent the state of Terengganu. The team is based in Kuala Terengganu, Terengganu, Malaysia. They play in the top division in Malaysian football, the Malaysian Super League. Their home stadium is the Sultan Ismail Nasiruddin Shah Stadium, Kuala Terengganu.

The 2013 season was Terengganu's 3rd season in the Malaysia Super League, and their 18th consecutive season in the top-flight of Malaysian football. In addition, they were competing in the domestic tournaments, the 2013 Malaysia FA Cup and the 2013 Malaysia Cup

Terengganu will announce their sponsors for the 2013 season as well as presenting the new kits on 3 January 2013.

Club

Current coaching staff

Kit sponsors
• Specs • 
Desa Murni Batik
• PFCE
• Zon Ria
• Sinar Harian
• TDM Berhad
• Mizi Sports
• Happy

Players 

Terengganu FA squad 2013.

All squad

Transfers

All start dates are pending confirmation.

In

Out

Pre-season and friendlies

Super League

The fixtures for the 2013 season were announced on 8 January 2013. The league is set to start on 8 January 2013.

League table

Results summary

Results by round

Matches 

 
Kickoff times are in +08:00 GMT.

FA Cup

Terengganu will begin their FA Cup campaign in the first round, vs Putrajaya SPA FC. The draw for the FA Cup's first and subsequent rounds was held on 10 December 2012 at Grand BlueWave Hotel, Shah Alam, Selangor.

Round of 32

Round of 16

Quarter-finals

Semi-finals

Malaysia Cup

Group stage

Statistics

Squad statistics

Top scorers

Last updated: 21 September 2013
Source: Match reports in Competitive matches

Captains

{| class="wikitable"
|-
!No.
! style="width:250px;"|Name
!Position
!No. Super League
!No. FA Cup
!No. Malaysia Cup
!Total
|-
|align=center|23
| Mohd Faizal Muhammad
|align=center|
|align=center|6
|align=center|1
|align=center|0
|align=center|7
|-
|align=center|13
| Hasmizan Kamarodin
|align=center|
|align=center|3
|align=center|2
|align=center|0
|align=center|5
|-

Scoring records
First goal of the season in Super League: Ismail Faruqi against FELDA United FC (8 January 2013)
First goal of the season in FA Cup: Ismail Faruqi against Putrajaya SPA FC (25 January 2013)
First goal of the season in Cup:
Fastest goal of the season in Super League: 9 minutes Effa Owona against PKNS FC (2 March 2013)
Fastest goal of the season in FA Cup: 2 minutes Ashaari against Penang FA (26 February 2013)
Fastest goal of the season in Cup:
Latest goal of the season in Super League: 90+2 minute, Farderin Kadir against T-Team FC (8 March 2013)
Latest goal of the season in FA Cup: 89 minute Khairul Ramadhan against Penang FA (26 February 2013)
Latest goal of the season in Cup:
Biggest win of the season in Super League: 2–0 vs Perak FA (15 February 2013)
Biggest win of the season in FA Cup: 3–0 vs Penang FA (26 February 2013)
Biggest win of the season in Cup:
Biggest loss of the season in Super League: 0–3 vs Pahang FA (22 January 2013)
Biggest loss of the season in FA Cup: 
Biggest loss of the season in Cup:

See also
 2013 Malaysia Super League season

References

External links
 Facebook Terengganu FA
 Facebook GanuSoccer.Net
 Facebook Terengganu FC
 Facebook UltrasTranung
 Facebook Kelab Penyokong PETEH
 Facebook AnokTranung FC
 Facebook TERENGGANU HANELANG
 Facebook PETEH GANU PETEH

Terengganu FC seasons
Malaysian football clubs 2013 season
Malaysian football club seasons by club